Max Doerner may refer to:

 Max Doerner (rugby league) (1889–1967), Australian rugby league player
 Max Doerner (artist) (1870–1939), German artist and art theorist